Solomon Schechter Day School of Bergen County is a Coeducational Jewish Day School at 275 McKinley Avenue in New Milford, New Jersey, United States. The school is a member of the New Jersey Association of Independent Schools. It enrolls 434 students from age 3 through 8th grade, has a staff count of 93 from both New York (state) and New Jersey.

History
In 1973-74, the Solomon Schechter Day School of Bergen County opened.

Campus
The school has an indoor basketball court with stage, fitness center, library, Holocaust Resource Room, Innovation lab with 3D printers, art and music rooms, computer lab, Beit Midrash, and kosher cafeteria. The campus also includes outdoor basketball courts, AstroTurf soccer fields, gaga pit, vegetable gardens and monarch butterfly sanctuary.

Administration
 Head of School - Steve Freedman 
 Director of Education and Judaic Studies - Ricky Stamler-Goldberg* School Rabbi - Rabbi Efrem Reis 
 Middle School Principal - Jennifer Coxe 
 Early Childhood & Lower School Principal, Director of General Studies - Lauren Goldman-Brown
 Director of Student Learning - Liav Shapiro
 Director of Early Childhood - Gena Khelemsky
 School Psychologist - Ilana Kustanowitz 
 Director of Operations and Finance - Ronni Brenner 
 Director of Admissions - Charlotte Carter 
 Director of Institutional Advancement - Michelle Weinraub

Notable alumni

 Jack Antonoff (born 1984), guitarist for the band Fun
 Dan Colen (born 1979), artist
 Dave Jeser (born 1977), television writer
 Rob Kaminsky (born 1994), pitcher drafted by the St. Louis Cardinals with the 28th pick in the 2013 MLB Draft, made his major league debut in 2020
 Ari Levine (born 1984), Grammy-nominated songwriter and record producer, one-third of the trio The Smeezingtons
 Elijah Wolfson (born 1985), journalist and senior editor of Newsweek

References

External links
Solomon Schechter Day School of Bergen County homepage
Data for the Solomon Schechter Day School of Bergen County, National Center for Education Statistics

Conservative Jewish day schools
Conservative Judaism in New Jersey
Jewish day schools in New Jersey
New Jersey Association of Independent Schools
New Milford, New Jersey
Private elementary schools in New Jersey
Private middle schools in New Jersey
Schools in Bergen County, New Jersey